James Lee Schrader (June 27, 1932 – January 16, 1972) was an American football center and tackle in the National Football League for the Washington Redskins and the Philadelphia Eagles from 1954 to 1964.

Schrader attended and played college football at the University of Notre Dame and was then drafted by the Redskins in the second round of the 1954 NFL Draft.

With the nickname "Big Jim" and listed at 6'-2" and 244 lbs, Schrader played in 116 NFL games, starting 48 of them.

Even though, in his 10-year career, Jim never played for a team that finished with a winning record. he was a Pro Bowl selection in 1958, 1959 and 1961.

College years

After graduating from Scott Township High School in Carnegie, PA, he went on to the University of Notre Dame, where he played under head coach Frank Leahy who was the former line coach for the Seven Blocks of Granite and played shoulder-to-shoulder with Tackle Art Hunter Guard Menil Mavraides, and Fullback Neil Worden as the main blockers for Heisman Trophy winning running back Johnny Lattner.

His Senior year, the 1953 Notre Dame finished the season 9-1, and had an unprecedented 12 players drafted to '54 NFL.

Before the start of the 1954 NFL season, Schrader, joined four of his Fighting Irish classmates, in the 1954 summer classic College All-Star Game, where they lost 31–6 to the Detroit Lions in front of 93,000 fans.

References

1932 births
1972 deaths
Eastern Conference Pro Bowl players
Notre Dame Fighting Irish football players
Philadelphia Eagles players
Washington Redskins players
People from Weston, West Virginia
Players of American football from West Virginia